Édouard Crut (16 April 1901 – 24 October 1974) was a French footballer who played for Étoile Carouge, US Saint-Mandé, Gallia Club Lunel, Marseille, OGC Nice, FAC Nice and AS Cannes, as well as for the French national side.

References

1901 births
1974 deaths
French footballers
France international footballers
Olympic footballers of France
Footballers at the 1924 Summer Olympics
Olympique de Marseille players
OGC Nice players
AS Cannes players
Expatriate footballers in Switzerland
Étoile Carouge FC players
Ligue 1 players
Sportspeople from Neuilly-sur-Seine
Association football forwards
Footballers from Hauts-de-Seine